Hörður Árnason (born 19 May 1989) is an Icelandic football left back playing for HK.

Club career
Hörður started his career with local club HK in 2008, having spent the 2007 season on loan to affiliate club Ýmir. He moved to Stjarnan in the Úrvalsdeild before the 2011 season.

In September 2019, at the end of the Icelandic 2019 season, 30-year old Hörður announced his retirement from football. In May 2020, before the Icelandic 2020 season, he decided to start playing again.

International career
Hörður made his first international appearance on 19 January 2015 in a match against Canada, playing the entire match.

References

External links

1989 births
Living people
Hordur Arnason
Hordur Arnason
Hordur Arnason
Hordur Arnason
Hordur Arnason
Association football fullbacks